Douglas H. Ubelaker (born 1946) is an American forensic anthropologist. He works as a curator for the Smithsonian Institution, and has published numerous papers and monographs that have helped establish modern procedures in forensic anthropology. He has also done work in Latin America, with Native Americans, and assists the FBI in forensic cases.

Life 

Ubelaker was born August 23, 1946 in Horton, Kansas. He became interested in Anthropology after working with Dr. Bill Bass on an American Indian project in the Dakotas. He received his B.A. at the University of Kansas in 1968.

He spent the years of 1969 to 1971 in the United States Army. In the Army, he first served as a military policeman, then as a microbiology technician. Working as a technician connected him with the National Museum of Natural History and eventually led to his employment at the Smithsonian Institution. In 1973 Ubelaker received his Ph.D. from the University of Kansas; he is also board certified in forensic anthropology by the American Board of Forensic Anthropology. He then returned to Washington to work in the position formerly held by T. Dale Stewart at the National Museum of Natural History. He also teaches a forensic anthropology course at The George Washington University.

References

External links 
 Smithsonian Institution Anthropology Page

1946 births
Living people
University of Kansas alumni
American anthropologists
Forensic anthropologists
People from Horton, Kansas